Alcithoe fissurata is a species of sea snail, a marine gastropod mollusc in the family Volutidae, the volutes.

References

 Powell A W B, New Zealand Mollusca, William Collins Publishers Ltd, Auckland, New Zealand 1979 

Volutidae
Gastropods of New Zealand
Gastropods described in 1963